José de Lima (February 21, 1924 – June 12, 2013) was a Brazilian prelate of the Catholic Church.

José de Lima was born in Tiros and ordained a priest on December 8, 1948. Lima was appointed bishop of the Diocese of Itumbiarao on April 13, 1973 and was ordained bishop on July 15, 1973. Lima was appointed bishop of the Diocese of Sete Lagoas on July 7, 1981. Lima would retire from the diocese on October 27, 1999.

See also
Diocese of Sete Lagoas
Diocese of Itumbiarao

External links
Catholic-Hierarchy
Diocese of Itumbiarao 

20th-century Roman Catholic bishops in Brazil
1924 births
2013 deaths
Roman Catholic bishops of Itumbiara